Adrian Mills (born 16 July 1956) is a British television presenter and actor. He appeared on That's Life! with Esther Rantzen for seven years until its demise in 1994. 
Since then, he has presented talk show Central Weekend Live, reported for BBC viewer feedback programme Bite Back and appeared as a location reporter on the TV series Surprise, Surprise, and in later years was a host on Getaways, TV Travel Shop. Sky Travel, Cruise First, and the LBC radio travel clinic. All this adds to his interest in travel writing and photography. For two years, he co-presented the number one programme The AM Show and is a regular contributor to LBC and Talk Radio and now appearing as a regular guest on Talk TV.

Adrian attended The National Youth Theatre for four years and graduated from The Rose Bruford College of Speech and Drama in 1977. 
In 1982, he played Aris in the Doctor Who series Kinda. He has appeared on numerous TV programmes such as Minder, Brookside, Play for Today, Bad Penny, Waiting for God, Fairly Secret Army, That’s My Boy, and took the lead, in the film 'The Man Who Cries for Others'. In 2019 he appeared in the West End as the narrator of the musical ‘Call me Diana’ based on the life of the Princess. He has recently hosted Sunday at the Musicals in London, Eastbourne and Windsor as well as being reunited with Dame Esther Rantzen presenting a highly successful series of podcasts entitled That’s After Life. 

Adrian Mills is the co-owner of Thai Tho, a chain of Thai restaurants located in London; which included a site in Ealing, which was damaged in the riots of 2011. He is a patron of The Holly Lodge Centre in Richmond Park and Chairman of The Wimbledon Village Business Association

References

External links

Adrian Mills official web site

Living people
1956 births
British television presenters